George Rawlins (22 September 1803 – 21 October 1848) was an English cricketer. He was associated with Sheffield Cricket Club and was recorded in 18 first-class cricket matches between 1826 and 1836. Principally a bowler, though of unknown type, he took 41 wickets with a best return of 5/45, one of two occasions when he took five wickets in an innings. He scored a total of 137 runs with a highest score of 12.

References

1803 births
1848 deaths
English cricketers
English cricketers of 1826 to 1863
Sheffield Cricket Club cricketers